1996–97 was the 35th season in the history of SD Compostela, and their third in La Liga.

Season summary

Fernando Vázquez's second season as Compostela coach was almost as successful as his first, as the club finished 11th in La Liga, only one place lower than the previous year. They once again reached the last 16 of the Copa del Rey, being eliminated 5–2 on aggregate at that stage by Atlético Madrid.

Squad

Left club during season

Squad stats
Last updated on 10 March 2021.

|-
|colspan="14"|Players who have left the club after the start of the season:

|}

La Liga

See also
SD Compostela
1996–97 La Liga
1996–97 Copa del Rey

References

SD Compostela seasons
Compostela